= California Science and Technology University =

University in Milpitas, California, US

Coordinates: 37.4051°N 121.9182°W

- Established: 2011
- Location: Milpitas, California, United States
- Website: cstu.edu

California Science and Technology University (CSTU) was founded on September 26, 2011, in Silicon Valley to provide postgraduate education. It is located at 1601 McCarthy Boulevard in Milpitas, California.

CSTU offers Bachelor and Master's degree programs in Computer Systems and Engineering (BSCSE and MSCSE), Bachelor and Master's degree in Business Administration (BSBA and MBA), and the Emerging Technology Training (ETTP) programs. CSTU's curriculum focuses on the latest technologies of Silicon Valley, such as Artificial Intelligence and Data Science, as stated in the CSTU's website. CSTU was accredited by Accrediting Commission of Careers Schools and Colleges (ACCSC) in June 2022. All CSTU teaching faculty not only have adequate academic training, also have at least four-year industrial experience.

The MSCSE, MBA and ETTP programs are offered online and onsite. Most classes are offered in evenings and weekends. CSTU's ETTP program is approved to offer training for VA education program. CSTU is also approved by the Employment Development Department, California, which can provide tuition for professionals who need training for new jobs.

Starting from 2022, CSTU has been approved to recruit international students. Based on the school's plan, the first batch of international students would arrive in 2023.

== Faculty ==
- Andreas Ramos
