= Andreas Ramos =

American writer

- Born: Colombia
- Education: Heidelberg University
- Occupation: Author
- Writing career
- Language: English
- Subjects: technology, business
- Website: www.andreas.com

Andreas Ramos is an American writer and adjunct professor at California Science and Technology University.

Ramos' firsthand account of the fall of the Berlin Wall was published in several history textbooks.

In 2001 he held a mock funeral for the internet.

== Bibliography ==
- Ramos, Andreas; Stephanie Cota (2009). Search engine marketing. New York: McGraw-Hill. ISBN 9780071597333.
- Ramos, Andreas; Stephanie Cota (2006). Insider SEO & PPC : get your website to the top of the search engines. Fremont, Ca: Jain Publishing. ISBN 0875730884.
- Ramos, Andreas (1996). Hands-on web site design. Fremont, Calif.: Jain Pub. ISBN 0875730760.
- Ramos, Andreas (1995). PCs for you & me. Fremont, Calif.: Jain Pub. ISBN 0875730620.
- Ramos, Andreas (1989). Your second manual to the Astari ST. Århus: Indigo 2. ISBN 8789488016.
- Wehner, Hasse; Gert Grønning; Andreas Ramos (1989). Harlekin. Viby J.: Mermaid Group. ISBN 8789488024.
